is an arcade collectible card game in Bandai's Data Carddass line of machines, which was launched in May 2016. It is the successor to the Aikatsu! series of arcade games. The game revolves around using collectible cards featuring various clothes to help aspiring idols pass auditions. An anime television adaptation by BN Pictures began airing on TV Tokyo from April 7, 2016 to March 29, 2018. It was succeeded by Aikatsu Friends! on April 5, 2018.

Plot

The series features a new protagonist named Yume Nijino. Yume aims to become a top idol, and she, and her childhood friend Koharu, enroll in Yotsuboshi Gakuen (Four Star Academy). She also receives attention from a male idol named Subaru, who is a popular male idol from M4 and who has possibilities of having a crush on Yume due to his way of speaking and body language when she is around him. He also cares a lot for her. She also meets Rola Sakuraba, Ako Saotome and Mahiru Kasumi who become here great friends. The academy has a special group called S4, who are the top four idols in the school. There are four classes Flower Song Class, Bird Theatre Class, Wind Dance Class, and Moon Beauty Class. Yume and the other first-year students aim to become a part of the S4.

In the second season "Hoshi no Tsubasa" (Star Wings), Venus Ark, a new rival school to the protagonist Yume Nijino's Yotsuboshi Gakuen that uses a ship as its schoolhouse, will appear. And new idols from the school, the "perfect idol" Elza Forte and Kirara Hanazono join the story that will feature the highest class dress type "Star Premium Rare Coord".

Media

Game
Data Carddass Aikatsu Stars is a Data Carddass game for Season 1. In season 2, a new Data Carddass game named "Data Carddass Aikatsu Stars Wings Of Stars" appeared. Two 3DS games have been released. The first 3DS game, named "Aikatsu Stars First Appeal", was released on July 20, 2016. The second 3DS game, titled "Aikatsu Stars My Special Appeal", was released on November 24, 2016.

Anime

An anime television series produced by BN Pictures began airing on TV Tokyo from April 7, 2016, succeeding the original Aikatsu! anime series in its initial timeslot.

Music
Many of the songs were composed and arranged by Monaca, and performed by members of the Japanese idol group AIKATSU☆STARS who provide the singing voices for the characters. Some of the insert songs are the theme songs but sung by different members from the opening or closing. The songs have been compiled into several albums.

Anime opening theme songs
" (episodes 1–25) by Sena and Rie
"1, 2, Sing for You!" (episodes 26–33) by Sena, Rie, Miki and Kana
"" (episodes 34–50) by Sena, Rie, Miki, and Kana
"STARDOM!" (episodes 51- 75) by Sena, Rie, Miki, Kana
"MUSIC OF DREAM!" (episodes 76-100) by Sena, Rie, Miki, Kana

Anime ending theme songs
"episode Solo" (episodes 1–25) by Ruka, Nanase, Kana and Miho
"So Beautiful Story" (episodes 26–50) by Ruka and Sena
"Bon Bon Voyage!" (episodes 51–75) by Risa, Miho
"Pirouette Of The Forest Light" (episodes 76-100) by Ruka, Sena

References

External links
 Official card game website 
 Official anime website 

2016 anime television series debuts
2016 video games
2016 anime films
Arcade video games
Arcade-only video games
Bandai Namco franchises
Bandai Namco games
Bandai Namco Pictures
Japan-exclusive video games
Japanese idols in anime and manga
Aikatsu!
TV Tokyo original programming
Video games developed in Japan